Kharnal is a village in Nagaur district of Rajasthan, India. It is the birthplace of Tejaji. It is situated at a distance of 16 km from Nagaur in the south-west direction on Nagaur - Jodhpur Road. The Kharnal village was abandoned many times in the past and presently it is situated at a distance of 1 mile in north-west of ancient village. Tejaji is considered to be folk-deity and worshiped in entire Rajasthan and Malwa in Madhya Pradesh by all communities. He was born on Bhadrapad Shukla Dashmi in year 1074, in the family of Dhaulya gotra Jats. His father was Chaudhary Taharji, a chieftain of Kharnal. His mother's name was Sugna. Mother Sugna is believed to have got son Teja by the blessings of Naag-deity.

Demography
It is the main village of Dhaulya Jats.  There are four branches of Dhaulyas descendants of Hema, Dulha, Dhanna and Pipa. Other Jat gotras in the village are Dahiya, Mahiya, Jakhar, Karvir and Benda.

Other castes dwelling in the village are Muslims, Teli, Nayak, Balai, Luhar, Sunar, Brahman and Baniya. There is no Rajput.

There is a big temple of Tejaji in Kharnal facing north direction. In the temple there is a brass statue of Tejaji with mukut and kalgi and a bhala in hand.  Outside the village there is a small temple of Tejaji at a distance of 1.5 km from big temple. People of this village tell that the statue of Tejaji had come out of soil naturally. This statue is believed to be about 1000 years old. This temple is located in Dhawa johar, the water of which is used for drinking by the villagers.

−	
Temple of Rajal, sister of Tejaji, who became sati with Tejaji, is situated at a distance of 1 km from village in the east direction.

Kharnal is  also a village in Doda district in Jammu and Kashmir.

See also
 Tejaji - for complete information about the deity.
 Sursura
 Paner

References

Villages in Nagaur district